Šumma ālu ina mēlê šakin is the title for a series of a collected number of cuneiform texts of ancient Mesopotamia amounting to  one hundred and twenty clay tablets.

The title translates as If a City is Situated on a Height, and it lists over ten thousand omens.

Many of the omens listed in this group begin with the words "Šumma ina āli ma'du (kind of people)," as in, "if there are too many kinds of people," and the omens in this group then proceed with a description of misfortune or negative occurrence.

Similarities are recognised within the nature of the series and in other types of works that are concerned with hemerology and menology.

References

External links
 http://ccp.yale.edu/omen-series-summa-alu
 https://www.jstor.org/stable/23503257?seq=1#page_scan_tab_contents
http://www.britishmuseum.org/research/collection_online/collection_object_details/collection_image_gallery.aspx?partid=1&assetid=1490125001&objectid=279109
http://www.upenn.edu/pennpress/book/2147.html

Akkadian literature